KSHY-LP (94.3 FM) was a low-power radio station broadcasting a religious format. Licensed to Newport, Oregon, United States, the station is currently owned by Sacred Heart of Jesus Educational Association.

References

External links
 

SHY-LP
SHY-LP
Newport, Oregon
Defunct radio stations in the United States
Radio stations disestablished in 2013
Defunct religious radio stations in the United States
2013 disestablishments in Oregon
SHY-LP